Əlik is a village and municipality in the Quba Rayon of Azerbaijan.  It has a population of 1,069.  The municipality consists of the villages of Əlik, Cek, Haput.

References

External links

 Alik, Azerbaijan

Populated places in Quba District (Azerbaijan)